Ferry Cross the Mersey is a 1965 British musical film featuring Gerry and the Pacemakers. It is frequently considered to be their version of the Beatles' A Hard Day's Night.

The film shows the story of art students Gerry and Fred Marsden, Les Maguire, and Les "Chad" Chadwick as they humorously try to navigate the Liverpool beat scene. After Gerry's girlfriend Dodie (Julie Samuel) helps the group enter a music competition, their instruments are misplaced but are ultimately found in time for them to take the stage and win the contest.

Plot 
The film opens with Gerry and the Pacemakers stepping off a plane after returning from a trip to America ("It's Gonna Be Alright"). They are greeted by screaming young fans who chase them down the street as they drive off. Once they are far enough from the crowd, the setting shifts to a scene of the group in the studio recording the song "It's Gonna Be Alright".

The movie then goes back in time to before the band made it big. Gerry gives a monologue about living in Liverpool and meeting the band members overlaid on top of shots of children playing and mingling in the street. The band is shown playing "Why Oh Why?" at the Cavern Club to a screaming audience. The next day, Aunt Lil (Mona Washbourne) tries to wake Gerry up from bed with a cowbell. To her surprise, he is already awake and listening to the radio. After checking the time, Gerry rushes out of bed and gets dressed in a fast-motion sequence before meeting his family for breakfast. After eating, he scooters off to catch the ferry ("All Quiet on the Mersey Front") where the rest of the band is waiting for him. They sing "Ferry Cross the Mersey" to the surrounding passengers. When the boat docks, they all scooter off to the art school. Before the art instructor enters the room and tells everyone to get to work, Dodie (Julie Samuel) reminds Gerry to come up with a good song to play at the beat competition. When the instructor leaves, the Pacemakers sing "Fall in Love". Once class ends, Dodie goes her separate ways as the group goes for lunch at a Chinese restaurant. As they wait for their food, they perform "This Thing Called Love".

In the meantime, Dodie meets with Jack Hanson (T.P. McKenna) and convinces him to consider managing the Pacemakers. He is invited to visit the band rehearsing "Think About Love" in a warehouse. After seeing the group along with an enthusiastic crowd that has arrived to watch as well, he offers to manage them. Gerry arrives home to join an orchestral rehearsal with Aunt Lil and company before retiring to his room to play "She's the Only Girl for Me". He later receives a letter saying Dodie had been involved in a car pile-up; the four men travel to her mansion to check up on her.

Dodie is in good health but tells the group that they've got stiff competition. They play "I'll Wait for You" in her music room. On Saturday, the Pacemakers–donning their new outfits–meet Hanson at a music store to try out new instruments ("Baby You're So Good to Me").

On the day of the competition, they rent a car from a funeral home to carry their gear and travel off to the Locarno ballroom. Jimmy Savile is the MC and opens the show with the Fourmost playing "I Love You Too"–they receive moderately high applause on the "Audiometer" which uses audience applause to measure who will win. The band is told to get ready after the number, but they discover the instruments they've dropped off have been accidentally taken to the airport. As other bands take the stage, they try to out-run the police while making sure to get their gear back in time. Back at the ballroom, the Black Knights among others take the stage. Hanson becomes increasingly anxious and asks Cilla Black to perform early ("Is it Love?").

Gerry and the Pacemakers find the group that had taken their gear and arrive back to the ballroom just as Black's performance ends. They take the stage just in time to play "It's Gonna Be Alright" to the exuberant crowd. The Audiometer puts them over the top and they win. The movie ends with the main characters on the ferry celebrating.

Cast

Production 
After Gerry and the Pacemakers' successful 1964 trip to America, manager Brian Epstein toyed with the idea of creating a film for the band. Tony Warren, creator of the soap opera Coronation Street, was hired as writer; he came up with a plot involving the band and ferryboats. Writer David Franden was hired in his place when Warren proved unable to complete a script despite "downing bottles of whisky".

The movie was filmed over the course of three months under the direction of Jeremy Summers. For authenticity, many scenes were shot near the home of Gerry and the Pacemakers' frontman Gerry Marsden. These locations included the Mountwood ferry on the River Mersey, the Albert Dock, The Cavern Club, Frank Hessy's music store, and the Locarno ballroom. A collection of location stills and corresponding contemporary photographs is hosted at reelstreets.com.

The soundtrack was released the same year; Marsden wrote nine new songs for the film. Cilla Black is also featured with her song "Is it Love?", along with the Fourmost with their track "I Love You Too". The album is rounded out with an instrumental by the George Martin Orchestra.

Future Doctor Who actress Elisabeth Sladen appeared in the film as an uncredited extra. Disc Jockey Steve Wright appeared in the crowd as a boy.

Reception 
Since its theatrical release, Ferry Cross the Mersey has rarely been shown on British television, nor was it released on video.

Eugene Archer of The New York Times found Ferry Cross the Mersey to be unoriginal and conformist, due to it being close in theme to the Beatles' A Hard Day's Night. Despite this, he considered the movie to be a modest comedy.

A reviewer from the Daily Cinema also saw similarities between the two films but found Ferry to be a "winner". They praised the humour, "exuberant personalities" of the band, and the soundtrack. Another review from the publication Variety, called the movie "noisy, corny, and full of clichés" due to the lax scriptwriting.

References

External links
 

1965 films
British musical films
1965 musical films
Films directed by Jeremy Summers
Films set in Liverpool
Films scored by George Martin
Jimmy Savile
1960s English-language films
1960s British films